Lunar pareidolia refers to the pareidolic images seen by humans on the face of the Moon. The Moon's surface is a complex mixture of dark areas (the lunar maria, or "seas") and lighter areas (the highlands). Being a natural element seen constantly by humans throughout the ages, many cultures have seen shapes in these dark and light areas that have reminded them of people, animals, or objects, often related to their folklore and cultural symbols; the best-known are the Man in the Moon in Western folklore and the Moon Rabbit of Asia and the Americas. Other cultures perceive the silhouette of a woman, a frog, a moose, a buffalo, or a dragon (with its head and mouth to the right and body and wings to the left) in the full moon. To many cultures of Melanesia and Polynesia, the Moon is seen to be a cook over a three-stone fire. Alternatively, the vague shape of the overall dark and light regions of the Moon may resemble a Yin Yang symbol.

The Man in the Moon

The Man in the Moon is an imaginary figure resembling a human face, head, or body, that observers from some cultural backgrounds typically perceive in the bright disc of the full moon. Several versions are displayed above.

Rabbit or hare

In Chinese culture, the rabbit in the Moon (a companion of Chang'e) is pounding medicine. Similarly, in Japan and Korea, popular culture sees a rabbit making mochi and tteok, respectively, in the Moon.

In Pre-Columbian Mesoamerica the rabbit is often associated with the Moon, for example, Tecciztecatl, the Aztec moon god, was pictured as an anthropomorphic rabbit. Frequently, the Maya moon goddess is represented with a rabbit in her lap. There is also a myth involving Quetzalcoatl and the Moon rabbit.

Female figures
In Elizabethan England, the spots of the Moon were supposed to represent a witch carrying sticks of wood on her back, or an old man with a lantern (which was illustrated by Shakespeare in his comedy A Midsummer Night's Dream). 

A more recent Western image is the profile of a coiffed woman wearing a jeweled pendant, the jewel being the crater Tycho, which at full moon is very bright and has bright radiating lines (rays). 

In New Zealand, the Māori legend holds that the Moon shows a woman with a local tree, the Ngaio. 

In Chinese Mythology, Chang'e (various spellings) lives on the Moon. She was mentioned in the conversation between Houston Capcom and Apollo 11 crew just before the first Moon landing:

The ancient Tagalogs see the lunar pareidolia as a face of a maiden (doncella) which they called sangmucti (sangmukti). Their name for said maiden is Colalaiyng (Kulalaying). Archbishop of Manila Felipe Pardo (1686-1688) mentioned in his inquisition report that the Tagalogs from Laguna also referred to her as “Dalágañg Binúbúkot” (Cloistered Maiden) and “Dalágañg nása Buwán”  (Maiden in the Moon).

Toad

"The toad was seen by Chinese Taoists as... the moon, representing Chang'e, the transformed wife of Yi, the excellent archer... According to Robert M. DeGraaff, in some representations of the moon-toad, the ling chih fungus is shown growing out of the creature's forehead."

Ali
Shia Muslims believe that the name of Ali Ibne-Abi Talib (Muhammad's son in law) is written on the Moon. This interpretation has roots in several hadith by Muhammad where he compares Ali to the Moon and himself to the Sun. There are also other esoteric interpretations of this analogy in Islamic philosophy.

King Mohamed V of Morocco
During the exile of the Moroccan royal family in Madagascar between 1953 and 1955, many Moroccans reported seeing the face of King Mohamed V on the Moon, in a sort of collective hallucination, possibly at the instigation of Moroccan nationalists who were distributing flyers with the King's image prior to that.

See also
Pareidolia

References

External links

Man in the Moon lore
Toad, Frog, and Rabbit in the Moon lore
The Crab in the Moon
The Man in the Moon and other weird things

Mythology
Rabbit in the Moon  Contrasting Asian and Aztec legends about the Moon Rabbit (See also Mochi (food))

Chinese moon festival legends
Chang Er flies to the Moon Another version of the Chang Er story
The Legend of Wukang  A sort of Chinese Tantalus
The Man in the Moon

Mythological characters
Moon myths
Fiction set on the Moon